Gargan may refer to:

 Edward Gargan (1902–1964), American actor
 Jack Gargan (politician), chairman of the Reform Party and candidate for the United States House of Representatives
 Jack Gargan (hurler) (1918–1991), Irish hurler
 John Gargan (disambiguation)
 Dan Gargan (born 1982), American soccer player
 Sam Gargan (born 1989), English footballer
 Mac Gargan, fictional character and most well-known incarnation of Spider-Man villain, the Scorpion

Mount Gargan has been used to describe various mountains said to have been visited by Michael the Archangel:
 Monte Gargano or San'Angelo, a mountain in Italy
 Mont Gargan, a mountain in France
 St Michael's Mount, off Cornwall in Britain